Douglas Raymond Buxton (12 February 1917 – 4 July 1984) was an Australian competitive sailor and Olympic medalist. He won a bronze medal in the 5.5 Metre class at the 1956 Summer Olympics in Melbourne.

References

External links
 
 
 
 

1917 births
1984 deaths
Australian male sailors (sport)
Olympic sailors of Australia
Olympic bronze medalists for Australia
Olympic medalists in sailing
Sailors at the 1952 Summer Olympics – Dragon
Sailors at the 1956 Summer Olympics – 5.5 Metre
Medalists at the 1956 Summer Olympics
20th-century Australian people